Oluwadare "Dare" Ogunbowale (born May 4, 1994) is an American football running back for the Houston Texans of the National Football League (NFL). He played college football at Wisconsin. Ogunbowale signed initially with the Houston Texans as an undrafted free agent in 2017, going on to join the practice squads of the Tampa Bay Buccaneers and Washington Redskins, then returning to Tampa Bay to play for two seasons.

College career

Ogunbowale walked onto the Wisconsin football team as a cornerback. He eventually switched to running back and racked up over 2,000 total yards and 15 total touchdowns. He was voted team captain his senior year.

College statistics

Professional career

Houston Texans
Ogunbowale was signed by the Houston Texans as an undrafted free agent on May 16, 2017. He was waived on September 2, 2017 and was signed to the Texans' practice squad the next day. He was released on October 6, 2017.

Tampa Bay Buccaneers
On November 29, 2017, Ogunbowale was signed to the Tampa Bay Buccaneers' practice squad. He was released on December 6, 2017.

Washington Redskins
On December 12, 2017, Ogunbowale was signed to the Washington Redskins' practice squad. He was promoted to the active roster on December 22, 2017 before being waived on March 6, 2018.

Tampa Bay Buccaneers (second stint)
On August 2, 2018, Ogunbowale signed with the Tampa Bay Buccaneers. He was waived on September 1, 2018 and was re-signed to the practice squad. On October 17, 2018, Ogunbowale was released from the Buccaneers practice squad. He was re-signed on October 31, 2018. He was promoted to the active roster on November 13, 2018. He was waived on November 30, 2018 and re-signed to the practice squad. He signed a reserve/future contract with the Buccaneers on December 31, 2018.

In the 2019 season, Ogunbowale was voted to be a team captain and finished with 35 receptions for 286 receiving yards to go along with 11 carries for 17 rushing yards and two rushing touchdowns.

On September 5, 2020, Ogunbowale was waived by the Buccaneers.

Jacksonville Jaguars
On September 10, 2020, Ogunbowale signed with the Jacksonville Jaguars. He re-signed with the Jaguars as an exclusive-rights free agent on April 19, 2021.

Houston Texans (second stint)
On March 23, 2022, Ogunbowale signed a two-year $3.3 million deal with the Houston Texans.

Personal life
Ogunbowale was born in the United States to parents who immigrated from Nigeria. His sister Arike is an All WNBA basketball player playing for the Dallas Wings of the WNBA. He attended Marquette University High School in Milwaukee, Wisconsin where he was a four sport athlete - football, soccer, basketball and track.

References

External links
Tampa Bay Buccaneers bio
Houston Texans bio

1994 births
Living people
Players of American football from Milwaukee
Wisconsin Badgers football players
Houston Texans players
Jacksonville Jaguars players
Tampa Bay Buccaneers players
Washington Redskins players
American sportspeople of Nigerian descent
Marquette University High School alumni